Pink: All I Know So Far is a 2021 documentary film about American singer-songwriter Pink.

All I Know So Far may also refer to:

 "All I Know So Far" (song), by Pink, 2021
 All I Know So Far: Setlist, the 2021 soundtrack to the film